John Cowan (born 8 January 1949) is a Northern Ireland international footballer who played as a midfielder.

Cowan was born in Belfast, and began his senior career with Irish League club Crusaders before moving to England, where he spent six years with Newcastle United but played only ten first-team matches. Two years as player-manager of League of Ireland club Drogheda preceded a return to England with Fourth Division club Darlington and non-league club Scarborough, but a knee injury forced his retirement at the relatively young age of 27. He played once for his country, against England in the 1970 Home Internationals. After retiring as a player, he set up a sports trophy business in Newcastle upon Tyne.

References

External links
 

1949 births
Living people
Association footballers from Belfast
Association footballers from Northern Ireland
Northern Ireland international footballers
Association football midfielders
Crusaders F.C. players
Newcastle United F.C. players
Drogheda United F.C. players
Darlington F.C. players
Scarborough F.C. players
English Football League players
League of Ireland players
Football managers from Northern Ireland
Drogheda United F.C. managers
League of Ireland managers